Awadhesh Pratap Singh University is a public university in Rewa city, Madhya Pradesh. The university was named after Captain Awadhesh Pratap Singh, a politician and an activist. Awadhesh Pratap Singh University is a non-profit public higher education institution located in the urban setting of the small city of Rewa (population range of 2,50,000-3,00,000 inhabitants), Madhya Pradesh. Officially recognized by the University Grants Commission of India, Awadhesh Pratap Singh University is a co-educational Indian higher education institution. It offers courses and programs leading to officially recognized higher education degrees such as bachelor degrees, master degrees in several areas of study. The university also provides several academic and non-academic facilities and services to students including a library, online courses and distance learning opportunities, as well as administrative services.

Affiliated colleges
Its jurisdiction extends over 7 districts - Anuppur,Rewa,Satna,Shahdol,Sidhi,Singrauli,Umariya  .

Campus 

The university is on a  expanse of land in the north of Rewa city, about 5 km from it, with its campus lying on either side of Rewa-Sirmour Road. Besides the overlooking administrative block, the complex comprises the departments of environmental biology, physics, science block, humanities block (including its extension), Ambedkar Bhawan (Hindi department), Tribal Centre, Computer Centre, Vikram Space Physics Centre, USIC, Central Library, Arjun Chhatra Griha, guest house, yoga hall, hostels for boys and girls, auditorium, stadium, and staff quarters. The construction of MBA department and the upper floor of Central Library building and Antarbharti are completed.

In the foot of the Vindhyas, the campus is cozy and environmentally friendly, far from the hustle and bustle of the city life. The campus presents a scene of ashrams of ancient times. Still the residents get all the facilities and amenities of modern life, such as, canteen, facilities for Xerox, STD and a small shopping center. The campus also has a large gymnasium hall, yoga hall and a big stadium as well as a Lord Shiva temple between a modest park (greenery).

There are branches of Allahabad Bank, Employment Bureau and a post office as well as medical dispensary on the campus. It has a small meteorological observatory and plans are afoot for a seismological observatory.

History

The university is named after Captain Awadhesh Pratap Singh, a distinguished son of the soil and a freedom fighter. The university was established on 20 July 1968 and got UGC recognition in February 1972. It has membership of the Association of Indian Universities (AIU) and All Commonwealth Association of Universities (ACAU).

External links 
 Awdhesh Pratap Singh University homepage

References 

Universities in Madhya Pradesh
Rewa, Madhya Pradesh
Educational institutions established in 1968
1968 establishments in Madhya Pradesh